Zinatun Nesa Talukdar is a Bangladesh Awami League politician and the former state Minister of Primary and Mass Education. She also served as the State Minister of Women and Children Affairs. She was one of the three female ministers out of 43 cabinet ministers in the First Sheikh Hasina Cabinet during 1996–2001.

Talukdar was awarded Begum Rokeya Padak by the Government of Bangladesh in 2018.

References

Living people
Awami League politicians
Women government ministers of Bangladesh
Primary and Mass Education ministers of Bangladesh
State Ministers of Women and Children Affairs (Bangladesh)
Recipients of Begum Rokeya Padak
Year of birth missing (living people)
Place of birth missing (living people)
9th Jatiya Sangsad members
20th-century Bangladeshi women politicians
21st-century Bangladeshi women politicians
21st-century Bangladeshi politicians
Deputy Ministers of Primary and Mass Education (Bangladesh)